Robbie Regan (born 30 August 1968) is a Welsh former professional boxing world champion who competed from 1989 to 1996. He held the WBO bantamweight title in 1996, the IBF interim flyweight title in 1995, and once challenged for the WBO flyweight title in 1995. At regional level, he held the British flyweight title twice between 1991 and 1992, and the EBU European flyweight title twice between 1992 and 1994.

Career
Regan started boxing as a teenager under trainer Dai Gardner, who remained his trainer throughout his career. As an amateur boxer, he won several titles and competed in the 1986 Commonwealth Games.

He made his professional debut on 19 August 1989, with a points draw against Eric George in Cardiff, Wales. His first title came on 28 May 1991, when he scored a twelve-round points decision over Joe Kelly to win the vacant British flyweight title. He lost the title in his first defence against Francis Ampofo on 3 September 1991, via eleventh round technical knockout (TKO), suffering the first loss of his professional career. Regan regained the British flyweight title in a rematch against Ampofo 3 months later on 17 December 1991, winning by twelve round points decision.

On 14 November 1992, Regan defeated European champion Salvatore Fanni, capturing the EBU European flyweight title via unanimous decision (117–116, 117–115, 117–114).

On 17 June 1995, Regan made his first attempt at a world championship by challenging Alberto Jiménez for his WBO flyweight title at the National Ice Rink in Cardiff, Wales, losing via ninth round stoppage. On 16 December 1995, Regan fought Ferid Ben Jeddou at the Welsh Institute of Sport in Cardiff, Wales, winning by second round knockout to capture the IBF interim flyweight title. Regan made a second attempt at a world championship on 26 April 1996, challenging two-weight world champion Daniel Jiménez for his WBO bantamweight title, again at the Welsh Institute of Sport in Cardiff. Regan won by unanimous decision (116–113, 116–111, 115–112), capturing the WBO title in what would be his final fight.

Regan's boxing career ended shortly after the WBO fight as he was diagnosed with glandular fever. Although he attempted to mount a comeback in 1998, he failed a brain scan and was forced to retire. He retired from boxing with a 17–2–3 record.

Professional boxing record

See also
 List of Welsh boxing world champions
 List of British flyweight boxing champions
 List of European Boxing Union flyweight champions
 List of bantamweight boxing champions

References

External links

1968 births
Living people
Welsh male boxers
Bantamweight boxers
World bantamweight boxing champions
World Boxing Organization champions
Flyweight boxers
World flyweight boxing champions
International Boxing Federation champions
European Boxing Union champions
Boxers at the 1986 Commonwealth Games
Commonwealth Games competitors for Wales